Brewer Fountain is a 1868 bronze sculpture by Michel Joseph Napoléon Liénard. It stands near the corner of Park and Tremont Streets in Boston, Massachusetts, by Park Street Station.

History
The 22-foot-tall (6.7 m), 15,000-pound (6,800 kg) bronze fountain, cast in Paris, was a gift to the city by Gardner Brewer. It began to function for the first time on June 3, 1868. It is one of several casts of the original, featured at the 1855 Paris World Fair, designed by French artist Michel Joseph Napoléon Liénard; other copies with minor variations can be found across the world, including the Steble Fountain in Liverpool or the Tournouy Fountain in Québec.

At least sixteen other copies exist, including one on Av. The fountain is decorated with the figures of Neptune, Amphitrite (Neptune's wife), and Acis and Galatea, a couple from Greek mythology. It fell into disrepair and finally stopped functioning entirely in 2003. A major repair project began in 2009. After a year-long $640,000 off-site restoration led by sculpture conservator Joshua Craine of Daedalus Inc., it was re-dedicated on May 26, 2010.

See also
 1868 in art

References

External links
 The Brewer Fountain, (sculpture). at the Smithsonian Institution

Boston Common
Bronze sculptures in Massachusetts
Buildings and structures in Boston
Fountains in Massachusetts
Outdoor sculptures in Boston
Sculptures of men in Massachusetts
Sculptures of mythology
Sculptures of Neptune
Sculptures of women in Massachusetts
Statues in Boston
Tourist attractions in Boston